Navarro the Dancer (German:Die Tänzerin Navarro) is a 1922 German silent film directed by Ludwig Wolff and starring Alexander Granach, Asta Nielsen and Iván Petrovich.

Cast
In alphabetical order
 Alexander Granach as Clegg  
 Asta Nielsen as Carmencita Navarro  
 Iván Petrovich as Mortensen  
 Adele Sandrock as Mutter Navarro  
 Hans Wassmann as Marcellus Gondriaan

References

Bibliography
 Grange, William. Cultural Chronicle of the Weimar Republic. Scarecrow Press, 2008.

External links

1922 films
Films of the Weimar Republic
German silent feature films
Films directed by Ludwig Wolff
UFA GmbH films
German black-and-white films